The 2013–14 Cypriot Second Division was the 59th season of the Cypriot second-level football league. It began on 14 September 2013 and ended on 12 May 2014. There was a new league system in place with the league being split into a two tier system, Divisions B1 and B2. The first two teams of B1 Division were promoted to Cypriot First Division and the last four teams were relegated to B2 Division. The last four teams of the 2013–14 Cypriot First Division were relegated to 2013–14 B1 Division, meaning the First Division would drop in size by two teams (12 teams in total).

Team Changes from 2012–13

Teams promoted to 2013–14 Cypriot First Division
 Aris Limassol
 Ermis Aradippou
 AEK Kouklia

Teams relegated from 2012–13 Cypriot First Division to 2013–14 B1 Division
 Ayia Napa
 AEP Paphos 
 Olympiakos Nicosia

Teams relegated from 2012–13 Cypriot Second Division to 2013–14 B2 Division
 PAEEK
 AEZ Zakakiou
 Onisilos Sotira
 Chalkanoras

Teams relegated from 2012–13 Cypriot Second Division to 2013–14 Cypriot Third Division
 Akritas Chlorakas
 Ethnikos Assia

Teams promoted from 2012–13 Cypriot Third Division to 2013–14 B2 Division
 Karmiotissa Polemidion
 EN Parekklisia
 Digenis Voroklinis
 ASIL Lysi

Stadia and locations

B1 Division

Note: Table lists clubs in alphabetical order.

B2 Division

Note: Table lists clubs in alphabetical order.

League table

B1 Division

B2 Division

Sources

Cypriot Second Division seasons
2013–14 in Cypriot football
Cyprus